Tampereen Pallo-Veikot (TPV) is a Finnish football club, based in Tampere. The club plays in the Kakkonen, the third highest level of football in Finland. It is the second largest football club in the Pirkanmaa region in terms of active members, with 1,600 members in 2005.

History
The club was founded in 1930 as a general sports club for workers. In the past there were also bandy, boxing and ice hockey sections, but nowadays TPV is purely a football club. In the 1960s TPV played three seasons at the highest level of Finnish ice hockey. Before the 1950s the clubs of Finnish Workers' Sports Federation played in their own leagues that were not connected to the Football Association of Finland. Tampereen Pallo-Veikot won the Finnish Workers' Sports Federation championship six times.

TPV later joined the Finnish FA and competed at the highest level in the top tier of the Finnish football league system for five seasons in 1971, 1993–1995 and 1999. The most successful year was in 1994 when the club won the Finnish Championship, but the next season they were relegated to the Ykkönen.

In July 1998 there were plans to merge TPV and the other local Tampere club FC Ilves but TPV decided to continue as its own team and FC Ilves reformed as Tampere United nicknamed TamU. In 1999 the club regained its Veikkausliiga status, but this only lasted for one season. In 2002 TPV had to abandon its place in the second tier Ykkönen most likely due to financial issues.

They were promoted back to Ykkönen in 2006 and stayed for four seasons before being relegated to the 3rd tier Kakkonen again. Finally in 2018 TPV defeated MyPa in the Kakkonen Promotion Playoffs to be promoted back to the 2nd tier Ykkönen.

Markus Räikkönen, husband of Finnish Prime Minister Sanna Marin played in the club between 2006 and 2009.

Honours 
Veikkausliiga 
 Champions: 1994

European record

Season to season

Current squad 2019

References

External links
Official website

 
Football clubs in Finland
Sport in Tampere
1930 establishments in Finland
Association football clubs established in 1930